The Best of Joe Walsh is a compilation album by the American singer-songwriter and multi-instrumentalist Joe Walsh. The album was released in late 1978, on the label ABC Records. It features songs from his tenure with the James Gang as well as solo songs. Two tracks from 1974's So What were newly remixed for this compilation; "Turn to Stone" and "Help Me Through the Night".

Critical reception

Village Voice critic Robert Christgau wrote: "'Twixt James Gang and Eagles Walsh justified his existence by developing his own brand of spacey, tuneful guitar schlock. I admit that it sounds like nothing else. But I can't imagine why anyone would want this much of it." Stephen Thomas Erlewine of AllMusic was more enthusiastic and said retrospectively, "this is not even close to a comprehensive collection, but it's not a bad sampler for extremely casual fans."

Track listing
All songs written and composed by Joe Walsh and Terry Trebandt, except where noted.

Personnel 

Joe Walsh: Guitars, Lead Guitar, Bass Guitar, Slide Guitar, Pedal Steel Guitar, Piano, Keyboards, Drums, Mandolin, Talkbox, Timpani, Hammond Organ, Percussion, Synthesizer, Vocals.
Kenny Passarelli: Bass guitar.
Tom Stephenson: Piano, keyboards, hammond organ.
Joe Vitale: Drums, keyboards, percussion, timpani.
Guille Garcia: Percussion.
Bill Szymczyk: Percussion.
Members of James Gang:
Dale Peters: Bass guitar, percussion, vocals.
Jim Fox: Drums, percussion, vocals.
Members of Eagles:
Don Felder: Backing vocals, Guitar.
Glenn Frey: Backing vocals, Guitar.
Randy Meisner: Backing vocals, Bass guitar.
Don Henley: Backing vocals, Drums.

References

Joe Walsh albums
1978 greatest hits albums
Albums produced by Bill Szymczyk
Albums produced by Joe Walsh
ABC Records compilation albums